Vladimir Belyavskiy (born 27 June 1962) is a Belarusian professional football coach and former player. He is an assistant coach with Alania Vladikavkaz.

Since 2010, Belyavskiy has been working closely with Anatoliy Yurevich as his assistant or co-coach.

References

External sources
 

1962 births
Living people
Belarusian footballers
Association football defenders
FC Belshina Bobruisk players
Belarusian football managers
Belarusian expatriate football managers
Expatriate football managers in Kazakhstan
FC Belshina Bobruisk managers
FC Ordabasy managers
FC Atyrau managers
FC Zvezda-BGU Minsk managers